Rodziah binti Ismail (born 8 July 1964) is a Malaysian politician who has served as Chairwoman of the  Development, Housing and Urban Well-being Committee, Chairwoman of the Entrepreneurial Development, Rural Development and Traditional Village Committee, Chairwoman of the Welfare and Women Affairs Committee, Chairwoman of the Welfare, Women Affairs, Science, Technology and Innovation Committee of Selangor in the Pakatan Rakyat (PR) and Pakatan Harapan (PH) state administrations under Menteris Besar Khalid Ibrahim, Azmin Ali and Amirudin Shari from March 2008 to her resignation in August 2014 and again since May 2018 and Member of the Selangor State Legislative Assembly (MLA) for Batu Tiga since March 2008. She is a member of the People's Justice Party (PKR), a component party of presently the PH and formerly PR state ruling but federal opposition coalitions.

Election results

References

External links

Members of the Selangor State Legislative Assembly
Selangor state executive councillors
Women MLAs in Selangor
Living people
1964 births
People from Perak
People's Justice Party (Malaysia) politicians
Malaysian people of Malay descent
Malaysian Muslims
21st-century Malaysian women politicians
University of Technology Malaysia alumni